Elimia ampla, common name ample elimia, is a species of freshwater snail with a gill and an operculum, an aquatic gastropod mollusk in the family Pleuroceridae.

Distribution 
This species is endemic to the Alabama, United States.

See also 
 Leptoxis ampla (Anthony, 1855) is another species with similar scientific name.

References

External links 

 U.S. Fish and Wildlife Service species profile

Gastropods described in 1854
Taxonomy articles created by Polbot